Longanesi, also known as Longanesi & C., is a publishing house based in Milan, Italy. It was founded in 1946 by Leo Longanesi and industrialist Giovanni Monti. It initially got a large success thanks to some editorial series such as  La buona società and La gaia scienza.

After a period of crisis, Longanesi was relaunched by Mario Spagnol (1930–1999) through the acquisition of some prestigious publishing houses such as Guanda, Salani and Corbaccio and through some successful ventures in the field of paperbacks.

References

External links
 

Book publishing companies of Italy
Publishing companies established in 1946
Mass media in Milan
Italian  companies established in 1946